The Ngwa dialect  is an Igboid language spoken primarily by the Ngwa people of Abia state in south eastern Nigeria.

Writing system 

The ngwa dialect shares similar alphabets with the Igbo but with additional alphabet.

The tones are indicated with diacritics:
 the high tone is indicated by the absence of a diacritic: ;
 the low tone is indicated with the grave accent :  ;
 the falling tone is indicated with the circumflex accent :  ;
 the downstep is indicated with the macron : .

References 

Languages of Nigeria
Igbo language